Joe Torres may refer to:

 Joe Campos Torres (1954–1977), Vietnam veteran beaten by Houston police and subsequently died
 Joe Torres (journalist) (born 1963), Hispanic-American news anchor and reporter
 Joe Torres (baseball) (born 1982), American baseball pitching coach
 J. Torres (fl. 1990s–2018), Canadian comic book writer
 Joe Torres, actor in the American comedy series Hey Dude

See also
 Joe Torre (born 1940), American baseball executive, manager and former player
 Joseph de Torre (born 1932), Spanish-Filipino Catholic priest and philosopher
 José Torres (disambiguation), including José de Torres